V Cephei is a white main sequence star in the constellation Cepheus. It only varies slightly by 0.03 of a magnitude. It was suspected of being variable by American astronomer Seth Carlo Chandler noting in 1890 that it varied by 0.7 magnitude but that it needed more confirmation. Subsequent observers were divided in whether they noted variability or not. A subsequent study with photoelectric photometry showed no variability.

References 

Cepheus (constellation)
A-type main-sequence stars
Cephei, V
Durchmusterung objects
224309
118027
9056